Fluvidona griffithsi is a species of minute freshwater snail with an operculum, an aquatic gastropod mollusc or micromollusc in the family Hydrobiidae. This species is endemic to southern Queensland, Australia.

Etymology
F. griffithsi is named after Owen Lee Griffiths, who found the first specimens of this species.

Description
This species is, with the possible exception of a single specimen found north of Kyogle, as of yet unidentified and most probably belonging to a distinct species, unique amongst known Australian hydrobiids in being able to aestivate and withstand drying. The type series were found in dry soil in a small, dry creek bed on the landward side of a small hill, in a small coastal rainforest remnant in Burleigh Head National Park, Queensland. Several days after collection they were placed in water, after which they soon emerged and crawled about actively.

See also 
 List of non-marine molluscs of Australia

References

External links

Fluvidona
Gastropods of Australia
Endemic fauna of Australia
Gastropods described in 1999